"End to the Lies" is the first single by American alternative rock band Jane's Addiction from its fourth album The Great Escape Artist. It was released on March 30, 2011, via digital download, the band's first new release after 2003's Strays.

Background  
The song features TV on the Radio member Dave Sitek on bass, in place of the previous bassists Eric Avery and Duff McKagan. Master Musicians of Joujouka also contribute to the track on rhaita and additional percussion.

The song was compared to the works and the style of the TV on the Radio. The song progresses from Dave Sitek's funk-inspired grooves. It is noted for its "hypnotic tribal rhythm", which was attributed to Master Musicians of Joujouka's involvement, and Dave Navarro's "fuzzed-out" guitar work on the verse riff, which gave an impression of "pulsating."

Music video
The music video for the song features animated figures of Perry Farrell, Dave Navarro, and Stephen Perkins performing alongside and painted on a female nude model. A Todd Newman-directed video, which depicts the band members and Dave Sitek during the recording session of the song, was also released on April 8, 2011.

Track listing

References

External links
 
 Jane's Addiction - "End to the Lies" music video on YouTube

2011 singles
Jane's Addiction songs
Songs written by Perry Farrell
Songs written by Dave Navarro
Song recordings produced by Rich Costey
2011 songs
Songs written by Stephen Perkins
Songs written by Dave Sitek
Capitol Records singles